The Wayang Windu Geothermal Power Station is the largest geothermal power station in Indonesia. The facility utilizes two units, one with 110 MW and the other with 117 MW, with a total installed capacity of 227 MW. The power station is located near the town of Pangalengan, 40 km south of Bandung, West Java. An estimated cost of US$200 million was incurred in construction and development. A third unit of 127 MW is being planned and expected to be onstream by mid-2013.

The arrangements to establish and operate the Wayang Windu plant were part of the overall policy towards the development of geothermal energy in Indonesia

Geothermal field 
This reservoir is liquid-dominated, overlaid by three separate vapour-dominated reservoirs.

See also 

 Geothermal power in Indonesia
 Wayang-Windu
 List of geothermal power stations
 List of largest power stations in the world

References

External links 
 Star Energy (maps and images)

Geothermal power stations in Indonesia
Buildings and structures in West Java